Sara Mills is Emeritus Professor in Linguistics at Sheffield Hallam University, England. Her linguistic interests are the comparison of linguistic forms of expression in different languages, particularly in reference to politeness. Her other major work area is feminism.

She has published many books and articles on politeness and discursive approaches to the analysis of politeness. She has also published on feminist linguistic theory.

Books
1991: Discourses of Difference: An Analysis of Women's Travel Writing and Colonialism , Routledge, 
Mills argues that British women travelers "were unable to adopt the imperial voice with the ease with which the male writers did".
1997, 2004: Discourse (The New Critical Idiom Series, Routledge)
 Analyzes the term 'discourse' and examines theoretical assumptions surrounding it, discusses the works of various discourse theoretists
1997: 
2004: 
2003: Gender and Politeness 
 "Mills argues that, although women speakers, drawing on stereotypes of femininity, can appear to be acting more politely than men, there are many circumstances where women will act as "impolitely" as men." ... "Focuses on the conversational strategies used to avoid giving offence and shows how they relate to questions of gender"
2003:  Michel Foucault,  (Critical Thinkers Series, Routledge)
2003: (co-edited with Reina Lewis)  Feminist Post-Colonial Theory: An Anthology
2005: Gender and Colonial Space, Manchester University Press 
2008: Language and Sexism
2009: (with Dániel Z. Kádár) Ch. 2. "Politeness and Culture", In: Politeness in East Asia, Cambridge University Press
2011: (with Louise Mullany), Language Gender and Feminism
2012: Gender Matters: Feminist Linguistic Analysis, 
2017: English Politeness and Class,

References

Year of birth missing (living people)
Living people
Linguists from England
Women linguists
Academics of Sheffield Hallam University
Feminist studies scholars